Fruto (Spanish for "Fruit") is an unincorporated community in Glenn County, California. It is located along State Route 162.

The Southern Pacific Railroad once had a depot, machine shed, small yard, and turntable at Fruto. The branch from Willows ran 17 miles, mainly along State Route 162. The branch was removed in 1951, except for a six-mile portion outside Willows which is operated by the California Northern Railroad and serves a fiberglass plant. A post office operated at Fruto from 1888 to 1953.

Climate
According to the Köppen Climate Classification system, Fruto has a warm-summer Mediterranean climate, abbreviated "Csa" on climate maps.

References

Unincorporated communities in California
Unincorporated communities in Glenn County, California